Oscar Manutahi Temaru (born November 1, 1944) is a French politician. He has been President of French Polynesia (président de la Polynésie française), an  overseas collectivity of France, on five occasions: in 2004, from 2005 to 2006, from 2007 to 2008, in 2009, and from 2011 to 2013 and mayor of Faa'a since 1983.

Career
He first served as the President of French Polynesia (président de la Polynésie française) from June 15, 2004 until his Government lost a no-confidence motion on October 8, 2004. He was the caretaker President for two weeks after that, but was forced to give up the presidency until March 2005, when he was reelected after parliamentary by-elections.

He is leader of the five party coalition Union For Democracy, which includes his pro-independence party Tavini Huiraatira (People's Servant Party) and other smaller parties that support autonomy for French Polynesia rather than independence. Those parties unexpectedly defeated supporters of long-time leader Gaston Flosse in the May 2004 parliamentary elections.

On October 8, 2004, his government was censured and ousted by the Parliament, the Assembly of French Polynesia (Assemblée de la Polynésie française) by a vote of 29 to 28. There were calls for the French Government to step in and hold new elections, and allegations by the French Socialist Party that his Government was subject to acts of "methodical destabilisation" on the part of the French government. Gaston Flosse was re-elected President by the Assembly in a simple majority vote on October 22. The President of the Assembly, Antony Géros, cast doubt on the legitimacy of this election saying the vote for President (président de la Polynésie française) should occur on October 25 (see French Polynesia political crisis 2004). As a compromise, by-elections were set for February 13, 2005 for certain seats, which Temaru's coalition won. He was re-elected president (président de la Polynésie française) on March 3, 2005.

Temaru lost a vote of no confidence on 13 December 2006, after months of protests against the high cost of living in French Polynesia. Temaru had lost control of parliament due to defections. Gaston Tong Sang won the presidential election on December 26.

Temaru ran for parliament in the 2007 elections, but failed to win a seat.

On September 14, 2007, Temaru was elected as President of French Polynesia for the third time in three years (with 27 of 44 votes). He replaced Tong Sang, who lost a no-confidence vote on August 31.

On 12 February 2009, he was elected president yet again. He fell in a vote of no confidence on 25 November 2009, and was again replaced by Tong Sang.

He became President again on 1 April 2011.

It was under Temaru's presidency that French Polynesia became, in November 2011, a founding member of the Polynesian Leaders Group, a regional grouping intended to cooperate on a variety of issues including culture and language, education, responses to climate change, and trade and investment.

He was twice elected as the President of the Assembly of French Polynesia from February 2008 to February 2009, and from April 2010 to April 2011.

Background
Temaru was born at Faa'a on the island of Tahiti. He was educated in Faa'a and Papeete, where he received a thorough religious education. He was born to a Tahitian father and a Cook Island Māori mother, and has stated that he has Chinese ancestry.

An early political influence was Jean-Marie Tjibaou, philosopher and former leader of the Kanak Socialist National Liberation Front (FLNKS), who was assassinated in New Caledonia in 1989.

Temaru entered the French Navy for three years in 1961 and participated in the Algerian War of Independence. On his return to French Polynesia, he sat the exam to become a customs officer in Tahiti. In 1983, he retired from this position.

Temaru has been a vocal campaigner against nuclear testing by France at Moruroa and Fangataufa Atolls since the 1970s.  His main power base has been in the poor suburb of Faa'a on the outskirts of the capital Papeete.

In 1977, Oscar Temaru formed his political party, the Front for the Liberation of Polynesia (FLP). The party changed its name in 1983 to Tavini Huiraatira (People's Servant Party). The same year he was elected mayor of Faa'a, which position he continues to hold (as of 2004).

In 1986, Tavini Huiraatira obtained two seats in the territorial assembly, four seats in 1991, eleven in 1996, and thirteen in 2001. In 2004 the Union for Democracy Coalition won 27 of the 57 seats.

Temaru's coalition government program in 2004 included the gradual increase of the minimum wage to 150.000 Fcfp, work days that don’t start before 9am, an improvement of social services, political decentralisation, educational reform, and a revision of the new autonomy statute after French Polynesia was declared a French Overseas Country (pays d'outre-mer) in March 2004.

He pledged there would be no immediate moves to independence.

When asked by an Australian Broadcasting Corporation reporter "Most people call this place French Polynesia. What do you call it?" he replied "This is French-occupied Polynesia. That is the truth. This country has been occupied."

Racist comments controversy
In 2007, Temaru was found guilty of "racial discrimination" by the criminal court of Papeete for having referred to the European people living in French Polynesia as "trash", "waste". Temaru has appealed his conviction for racial discrimination.

Conflict of interest conviction
In September 2019, Oscar Temaru was convicted of 'unlawful taking of interests' (prise illégale d'intérêts) by the criminal court of Papeete for exercising undue influence as mayor of Faaa. The court found that under Temaru's watch, the municipality of Faaa had funded to the tune of 150 million Pacific francs (US$1.4 million) a pro-independence community station, Radio Tefana, which relayed the propaganda of Temaru's political party. Oscar Temaru was given a suspended six-month prison sentence and fined 5 million Pacific francs (US$46,500). Temaru has appealed his conviction. The criminal court of appeal was due to hear the case in August 2022.

2007-2008 Presidential Cabinet
Oscar Temaru announced his new presidential cabinet on September 19, 2007, shortly after his election as President of French Polynesia. The sixteen cabinet members include three women.

Vice-President; Minister of Finance, Housing, Lands, Outer Island Development, in charge of the reform of French Polynesia's Statute and of the relations with the Legislative Assembly and the Economic Social and Cultural Council, government spokesman: Antony Géros
Minister for public utilities, land and maritime transport: James Salmon
Minister for economy, labor, employment and vocational training, Minister for public service: Pierre Frébault
Minister for education, higher education and research: Jean-Marius Raapoto
Minister of health, in charge of prevention, food security and traditional medicine: Charles Tetaria
Minister for agriculture, forestry and livestock:  Léon Lichtlé
Minister for sea, fisheries and aquaculture: Keitapu Maamaatuaiahutapu
Minister for inter-island maritime and air transports: Dauphin Domingo
Minister for tourism and air transports: Marc Collins
Minister for development and environment: Georges Handerson
Minister for small and medium enterprises, Minister for industry: Gilles Tefaatau
Minister for posts and telecommunications, culture: Jacqui Drollet
Minister for the pearl farming sector: Michel Yip
Minister for solidarity, family affairs and the struggle against social exclusion: Patricia Jennings
Minister for youth and sports: Tauhiti Nena
Minister for women's affairs, arts and crafts: Valentina Cross

See also 
 Politics of French Polynesia
 2004 French Polynesian legislative election
 List of political parties in French Polynesia

References

1944 births
Presidents of French Polynesia
Speakers of the Assembly of French Polynesia
French Polynesian people of Cook Island descent
French Polynesian politicians of Chinese descent
Tavini Huiraatira politicians
People from Tahiti
Living people
Heads of government who were later imprisoned